The Sacramento Daylight was a named passenger train operated by the Southern Pacific Railroad, part of the family of "Daylights" which included the San Joaquin Daylight, Shasta Daylight, Coast Daylight, and Sunbeam. It carried train numbers 53 and 54.

The Southern Pacific introduced the Sacramento Daylight in 1946 as a Sacramento section of the Los Angeles—Oakland San Joaquin Daylight; the Sacramento cars were cut out at Lathrop. Around 1970 the through cars ended; the train from Sacramento ran past Lathrop to Tracy and connected to the Los Angeles train there. The San Joaquin/Sacramento Daylight survived until the formation of Amtrak on May 1, 1971, when they were both discontinued.

References

External links

Passenger trains of the Southern Pacific Transportation Company
Named passenger trains of the United States
Railway services introduced in 1946
Railway services discontinued in 1971